Fort McMurray was a provincial electoral district in Alberta, Canada, mandated to return a single member to the Legislative Assembly of Alberta using first-past-the-post balloting from 1986 to 2004.

Boundary history

The district was created for the 1986 election out of most of Lac La Biche-McMurray. Prior to the 1993 Alberta general election, the riding was re-defined as consisting of the city of Fort McMurray. Its boundaries remained unchanged even after Fort McMurray was folded into the Regional Municipality of Wood Buffalo in 1995. 

The riding was abolished in 2004, when it was merged with a portion of Athabasca-Wabasca to form Fort McMurray-Wood Buffalo.

Representation history

The riding's first MLA was Norm Weiss, who had already served two terms in the abolished Lac La Biche-McMurray district for the Progressive Conservatives. He retired after serving two more terms.

The open seat was picked up by Liberal candidate Adam Germain in 1993, coinciding with an increase in voter turnout. After serving one term, he decided to run in federal politics, leaving the seat open again.

The riding returned to the Progressive Conservatives in 1997, with candidate Guy Boutilier decisively defeating his Liberal challenger. He was re-elected with a much larger majority in 2001. When the riding was abolished at the end of his second term, he would continue on as MLA for the new riding of Fort McMurray-Wood Buffalo.

Election results

1986 general election

1989 general election

1993 general election

1997 general election

2001 general election

See also
List of Alberta provincial electoral districts
Fort McMurray, Alberta, an urban service area in the Regional Municipality of Wood Buffalo in Alberta, Canada

References

Further reading

External links
Elections Alberta
The Legislative Assembly of Alberta

Former provincial electoral districts of Alberta
Fort McMurray